Speck can refer to a number of European cured pork products, typically salted and air-cured and often lightly smoked but not cooked.
In Germany, speck is pickled pork fat with or without some meat in it. Throughout much of the rest of Europe and parts of the English-speaking culinary world, speck often refers to South Tyrolean speck, a type of smoked ham. The term "speck" became part of popular parlance only in the eighteenth century and replaced the older term "bachen", a cognate of "bacon".

Regional varieties
There are a number of regional varieties of speck, including:
 Bacon, e.g. Frühstücksspeck ("breakfast speck") in Germany
 Gailtaler speck from Austria, with PGI status, which has been made since the 15th century in the Gail Valley ("Gailtal") in Carinthia
 Schinkenspeck, German "ham bacon", typically made from a flat cut of ham with fat along one side resembling bacon, and traditionally soaked for several days in brine with juniper berries and peppercorn,
 Speck Sauris PGI, from Sauris, Friuli, Italy
 Speck Alto Adige PGI, from South Tyrol, Italy
 Tyrolean Speck from Austria's Tyrol region, which has PGI status, and has been made since at least the 15th century
 Ukrainian salo
 Proshute, Albanian speck

Jewish deli speck
In Ashkenazi Jewish cuisine, in which bacon (like all pork) is forbidden as unkosher, "speck" commonly refers to the subcutaneous fat on a brisket of beef. It is a particular speciality of delis serving Montreal-style smoked meat, where slices of the fatty cut are served in sandwiches on rye bread with mustard, sometimes in combination with other, leaner cuts.

See also

 List of dried foods
 List of smoked foods

References

Ham
Salumi
Charcuterie
Dried meat
Smoked meat